= 6/3 =

6/3 may refer to:

- June 3 (month-day date notation)
- March 6 (day-month date notation)
